Peninj is a pre-historic site located in Pinyinyi ward of Ngorongoro District in Arusha Region, Tanzania. This the site where the Peninj Mandible was discovered in 1964.

References

Ngorongoro District